The Audi Prologue is a series of concept cars unveiled by Audi at the 2014 LA Auto Show. 

The Prologue features a 4.0 TFSI V8 engine with 445 kW (605 hp) and 700 Nm (516.3 lb‑ft) of torque (750 Nm (553.2 lb‑ft) in overboost mode allowing it to accelerate from 0 to 100 km/h (62.1 mph) in 3.7 seconds), an eight‑speed tiptronic, Quattro (four-wheel-drive system) with torque vectoring and self-levelling air suspension with adaptive damping, dynamic all-wheel steering. It is equipped with Matrix laser headlamps, Audi virtual cockpit, 3 OLED tablet-like touchscreens and a next-generation Multi Media Interface.

A notable feature is the central driver assistance control unit (zFAS), a main computer in the vehicle trunk that controls all vehicle functions, dynamics and Advanced driver-assistance systems with real-time computing through a high-speed FlexRay optical fiber data network. It uses a Tegra K1 System on a chip.

Its design and technology previewed the next generation Audi A8, which was unveiled in 2017.

References

External links

 Audi Corporate website
 Audi Prologue - images and video 
 First drive: Audi's Prologue concept

Prologue